The 1985 Soviet Top League was the 16th season of the Soviet Top League, the top football league in Soviet Union. It also was 48th season of the top tier club competition. Zenit Leningrad were the defending champions.

Teams

Promoted teams
 FC Fakel Voronezh – champion (returning for the first time since 1961 after twenty 24 seasons, known as Trud Voronezh)
 FC Torpedo Kutaisi – 2nd place (returning after a season)

Location

Final table

Post-season promotion/relegation tournament
 For the following season the League was reduced to 16 members. The teams that finished 15th and 16th played a mini-tournament in format of home-away double round-robin with the two best out of the Soviet First League (Daugava Riga and CSKA Moscow). Out of this tournament the two best teams (Chernomorets Odessa and Nefchi Baku) continued on in the Soviet Top League. The tournament was conducted in winter-like conditions from 27 November to 15 December.

 For the 1986 season there was no promotion out of the Soviet First League.

Results

Top scorers
35 goals
 Oleh Protasov (Dnipro)

14 goals
 Vladimir Klementyev (Zenit)
 Sergey Rodionov (Spartak Moscow)

13 goals
 Fyodor Cherenkov (Spartak Moscow)
 Oleh Taran (Dnipro)

12 goals
 Oleg Blokhin (Dynamo Kyiv)
 Viktor Grachyov (Shakhtar)
 Sigitas Jakubauskas (Žalgiris)

11 goals
 Georgi Kondratyev (Dinamo Minsk)
 Sergei Volgin (Kairat)

Medal squads
(league appearances and goals listed in brackets)

Number of teams by union republic

References

 1985 season

Soviet Top League seasons
1
Soviet
Soviet